Barbara N. Horowitz, M.D., (also known as Barbara Natterson-Horowitz) is a cardiologist, academic and author. She is a Professor of Medicine in the Division of Cardiology at University of California, Los Angeles (UCLA) and a Visiting Professor in the Department of Human Evolutionary Biology at Harvard University and has been on the faculty of Harvard Medical School since 2020. Horowitz is a New York Times bestselling author of the book Zoobiquity (co-authored with Kathryn Bowers) on the subject of a cross-species approach to medicine which includes veterinary and evolutionary perspectives. In 2019, Horowitz and Bowers co-authored their second book, Wildhood.

Education
Horowitz earned her Bachelor’s and master's degrees from Harvard University. She earned her medical degree from the University of California, San Francisco. She went on to complete internal medicine and psychiatry residencies at the University of California, Los Angeles where she served as chief resident in both departments. Her postgraduate training included a fellowship in cardiovascular medicine (1992-1995) at the UCLA Division of Cardiology followed by advanced training in heart failure and cardiac imaging.

Career
Since 2017, she has been a Visiting Professor in the Department of Human Evolutionary Biology at Harvard University. Since 2020, she has been on the faculty of Harvard Medical School. She is a Professor of Medicine in the Division of Cardiology at the David Geffen School of Medicine at UCLA, and a Professor in the UCLA Department of Ecology and Evolutionary Biology. She practiced cardiology as an attending physician at UCLA Medical Center for more than twenty years, served as Director of Imaging at the UCLA Cardiac Arrhythmia Center, and instructor for multiple courses at the UCLA medical school.

Horowitz serves as cardiovascular consultant and a member of the Medical Advisory Board for the Los Angeles Zoo. The animals she has studied include the giraffe, of interest to cardiologists like Horowitz because of its height. To achieve blood pressure of 110/70 at its brain, a 6 meter-tall giraffe needs blood pressure at its heart of 220/180.  Giraffes sustain high blood pressure while remaining healthy as a result of genetic adaptations related to cardiovascular development, fibrosis, blood pressure and circulation.

Peter Lehmann reviewed her book Zoobiquity for readers in Germany, especially for psychiatric patients, and emphasized Horowitz's and Bowers’ reference to capture myopathy, which – according to the authors – may threaten agitated psychiatric patients in restraints in psychiatric wards, who can therefore die of heart failure, too.

In 2011, Horowitz and Kathryn Bowers founded the Zoobiquity Conference to bring together leaders from human and animal medicine for collaborations to accelerate biomedical innovation to advance human and animal health. There have been over 12 Zoobiquity Conferences held globally.

In 2019, Scribner published Horowitz and Bowers’ second book, Wildhood, which received positive reception and reviews from the New York Times, Los Angeles Times, Chicago Tribune and other notable critics and media sources. The book synthesized the authors’ years-long research on thousands of wild species searching for evidence of human-like adolescence and makes the case that all adolescents face the same tests and challenges to grow successfully.

Horowitz is President of the International Society for Evolution, Medicine and Public Health (2019-2021), a member of the National Academies of Science, Engineering and Medicine’s ILAR, and Commissioner for the Lancet One Health Commission. She was a keynote speaker at the 2019 Nobel Conference on biomimicry in medicine in Stockholm, Sweden.

Other publications
Horowitz publishes academic research in scientific journals such as Nature, Emerging Infectious Diseases, Echocardiography, The American Journal of Cardiology, Circulation.; and Proceedings of the National Academy of Sciences of the United States of America; and in media publications such as Newsweek, The New York Times, The Guardian, The Wall Street Journal, Scientific American, and New Scientist.

Personal life
Horowitz is married and has two grown children.

References

External links

American cardiologists
Women cardiologists
David Geffen School of Medicine at UCLA faculty
Year of birth missing (living people)
Living people
Harvard University alumni
University of California, San Francisco alumni
Women evolutionary biologists